Dario Benitovich Cirisano (born 12 June 2001) is a Russian ice dancer. With his former skating partner, Irina Khavronina, he is the 2020 Youth Olympic champion and 2022 Russian junior champion.

Personal life 
Cirisano was born on 12 June 2001 in Crotone, Italy, but moved to St. Petersburg in 2006. His father, Benito, is Italian, and he has an older sister, Valeria.

Career

Early years 
Cirisano began learning to skate as a five-year-old in 2006. He began competing in ice dance during the 2016–17 season, skating with Marina Tikhonova. Their partnership lasted two seasons.

In 2018, Cirisano teamed up with Irina Khavronina. The two finished 11th at the 2019 Russian Junior Figure Skating Championships.

2019–20 season: Junior international debut 
Khavronina/Cirisano made their international debut in January at the 2020 Winter Youth Olympics in Lausanne, Switzerland. They ranked first in both segments and outscored fellow Russians Sofya Tyutyunina / Alexander Shustitskiy by 5.48 points to take the gold medal.

2020–21 season 
Due to the COVID-19 pandemic, the international junior season was cancelled, and Khavronina/Cirisano competed exclusively domestically. They won the bronze medal at the 2021 Russian Junior Championships.

2021–22 season 
With the resumption of international junior competition, Khavronina/Cirisano received their first ISU Junior Grand Prix assignment to the 2021 JGP Russia in September. The team scored a new personal best to win the rhythm dance and ultimately took the gold medal overall, despite falling slightly behind compatriots Sofia Leonteva / Daniil Gorelkin in the free dance. 

At their next assignment, 2021 JGP Poland, Khavronina/Cirisano again upgraded their personal best in the rhythm dance, scoring 68.05 points to win the segment.

Programs

With Khavronina

Competitive highlights 
JGP: Junior Grand Prix

With Khavronina

Men's singles

Detailed results

With Khavronina

Junior results

References

External links 

 

2001 births
Russian male ice dancers
Living people
People from Crotone
People from Odintsovo
Figure skaters at the 2020 Winter Youth Olympics
Youth Olympic gold medalists for Russia
Italian emigrants to Russia
Sportspeople from the Province of Crotone